The 2017–18 Saudi Professional League (also known formerly as a Jameel League for sponsorship reasons), was the 42nd season of the Saudi Professional League, the top Saudi professional league for association football clubs, since its establishment in 1976. The season started on 10 August 2017 and concluded on 12 April 2018.

Al-Hilal were the defending champions after winning the Pro League last season for the 14th time. Al-Fayha and Ohod have entered as the promoted teams from the 2016–17 Saudi First Division. Al-Hilal were crowned as league winners for the second season in a row on the 12 April, after defeating Al-Fateh 4–1 on the final day of the season. No teams were relegated at the end of the season following the decision to increase the number of teams from 14 to 16. In its place, relegation play-offs were held between the bottom 2 teams of the Pro League and the 3rd and 4th placed teams of the MS League. Both Pro League teams, Al-Raed and Ohod, won their respective matches and secured their top-flight status.

Al-Fayha's Ronnie Fernández won the Golden Boot with 13 goals. Al-Ittihad's Carlos Villanueva and Al-Faisaly's Vuk Rašović were named as Player and Manager of the Season respectively.

Teams

Fourteen teams will compete in the league – the top eleven teams from the previous season, the playoff winner and two teams promoted from the First Division.

Teams who were promoted to the Pro League

The first club to be promoted was Al-Fayha, following their 2–1 win at home to Ohod on 29 April 2017. Al-Fayha will play in the top flight of Saudi football for the first time in their history. They were crowned champions on 5 May 2017 after drawing Wej 1–1 away from home, coupled with Al-Tai's 0–0 draw against fellow promoted club Ohod.

The second and final club to be promoted was Ohod, following their 0–0 draw at home to Al-Tai on 5 May 2017. Ohod will play in the top flight of Saudi football for the first time since 2005.

Teams who were relegated to the First Division

The first club to be relegated was Al-Wehda, ending their 2-year stay in the Pro League after a 2–1 home defeat to Al-Fateh on 20 April 2017.

The second and final club to be relegated was Al-Khaleej, ending their 3-year stay in the Pro League following a 2–2 draw to Al-Faisaly on 4 May 2017.

Stadiums
Note: Table lists in alphabetical order.

1:  Al-Faisaly play their home games in Al-Majma'ah. 
2:  Al-Hilal, Al-Nassr and Al-Shabab also use Prince Faisal bin Fahd Stadium (22,500 seats) as a home stadium.

 Personnel and kits 

 1 On the back of the strip.
 2 On the right sleeve of the strip.
 3 On the shorts.

Managerial changes

Foreign players
The number of foreign players was increased from 4 players to 6 players, and for the first time in the history of the Pro League foreign goalkeepers are allowed. On January 11, 2018, the Saudi FF increased the number  of foreign players from 6 players to 7 players.

Players name in bold indicates the player is registered during the mid-season transfer window.

League table

Positions by round
The following table lists the positions of teams after each week of matches. In order to preserve the chronological evolution, any postponed matches are not included to the round at which they were originally scheduled, but added to the full round they were played immediately afterwards. If a club from the Saudi Professional League wins the King Cup, they will qualify for the AFC Champions League, unless they have already qualified for it through their league position. In this case, an additional AFC Champions League group stage berth will be given to the 3rd placed team, and the AFC Champions League play-off round spot will be given to 4th.

Results

Season progress

Relegation play-offs
On March 7, 2018, the Saudi Football Federation announced that the number of teams in the Saudi Professional League will be increased from 14 teams to 16 teams. The relegation was removed and in its place, they announced a relegation play-off. The bottom 2 teams will face the 3rd and 4th place team in the Prince Mohammad bin Salman League.Al-Raed won 5–1 on aggregate.Ohod won 7–1 on aggregate.Statistics

Top scorers

Top assists

Hat-tricks

Clean sheets

 Discipline 

 Player 

 Most yellow cards: 11
 Majed Kanabah (Al-Batin)
 Sami Al-Khaibari (Al-Fayha)

 Most red cards: 117 players''

Club 

 Most yellow cards: 60
 Al-Ettifaq

 Most red cards: 3
 Al-Fateh

Attendances

By round

Source:

By team

†

†

Awards
For the first time in the history of the competition, the Saudi Football Federation announced annual awards for the best player in each position, best young player and the perfect team.

Manager of the Year: Vuk Rašović (Al-Faisaly)
Best Goalkeeper: Mohammed Al-Owais (Al-Ahli)
Best Defender: Motaz Hawsawi (Al-Ahli)
Best Full-back: Yasser Al-Shahrani (Al-Hilal)
Best Midfielder: Carlos Villanueva (Al-Ittihad)
Best Attacker: Ronnie Fernández (Al-Fayha)
Player of the Year: Carlos Villanueva (Al-Ittihad)
Young Player of the Year: Turki Al-Ammar (Al-Shabab)
Top Scorer: Ronnie Fernández (Al-Fayha)
Perfect Team: Al-Hilal

See also
 2017–18 Prince Faisal bin Fahd League
 2017–18 Second Division
 2018 King Cup
 2017–18 Crown Prince Cup

References

Saudi Professional League seasons
Saudi Professional League
1